Isaac Argyros (Greek: Ισαάκιος Αργυρός) was a Byzantine mathematician and monk, born about 1312, who wrote a treatise named Easter Rule, along with books on arithmetic, geometry and astronomy.

Works 
 An Easter Rule, a treatise on Easter
 New Tables: An Astronomical treatise, based on Ptolemaic astronomy

Bibliography 
 Science and Civilisation in China, Volume 3: Mathematics and the Sciences of the Heavens and the Earth, Joseph Needham, Cambridge University Press 1959,

References

1312 births
14th-century Byzantine people
Isaac
Greek mathematicians
Year of death unknown
14th-century Byzantine writers
14th-century astronomers
14th-century Byzantine scientists
Byzantine astronomers
14th-century Greek people
14th-century Greek scientists
14th-century Greek educators
14th-century Greek mathematicians
14th-century Greek astronomers